The canton of Pornic is an administrative division of the Loire-Atlantique department, western France. Its borders were modified at the French canton reorganisation which came into effect in March 2015. Its seat is in Pornic.

It consists of the following communes:
 
La Bernerie-en-Retz
Chaumes-en-Retz (partly)
Chauvé
Les Moutiers-en-Retz
La Plaine-sur-Mer
Pornic
Préfailles
Saint-Michel-Chef-Chef

References

Cantons of Loire-Atlantique